Kibangou (can also be written as Kibangu) is a small town in the Republic of Congo in the Kouilou Department.

Transport 

The town is approximately 20 km from a station on the Congo-Ocean Railway.

Industry 

It is a possible site for a cement works to be built by CMKC Group.

References 

Populated places in the Republic of the Congo